Barkhola Assembly constituency is one of the 126 Assembly constituencies in the North-East Indian state of Assam.

Overview
As per orders of the Delimitation Commission, No.14 Barkhola Assembly constituency is composed of the following: Barkhola thana and circle Nos. 20, 21, 22 and 38 in Silchar thana in Silchar sub-division.
Barkhola Assembly constituency is part of No. 2 Silchar Lok Sabha constituency.

Areas under Barkhola: (1) Salchapra CD Block, (2) Barkhola CD Block & (3) Tapang CD Block

Some of the Villages under Barkhola are: Dudhpatil, Buribail, Barjatrapur, Joynagar, Masimpur, Kumarpara, Rajnagar, Srikona, Bhangarpar, Sonapur, Dholcherra, Dolu, Chandranathpur etc.

Town Details

Country: India.
 State: Assam.
 District:  Cachar district.
 Lok Sabha Constituency: Silchar Lok Sabha/Parliamentary constituency.
 Assembly Categorisation: Rural
 Literacy Level: 80.36%.
 Eligible Electors as per 2021 General Elections: 1,52,054 Eligible Electors. Male Electors:77,005 . Female Electors: 75,049.
 Geographic Co-Ordinates:   24°56'02.4"N 92°45'58.3"E.
 Total Area Covered: 447 square kilometres.
 Area Includes: Barkhola thana and circle Nos. 20, 21, 22 and 38 in Silchar thana in Silchar sub-division, of Cachar district of Assam.
 Inter State Border : Cachar.
 Number Of Polling Stations: Year 2011-133, Year 2016-150, Year 2021-14.

Members of Legislative Assembly

Election results

2016 result

42

References

External links 
 

Assembly constituencies of Assam